I'm Going to Do What I Wanna Do is a live album from Captain Beefheart and the Magic Band. In support of the US release of his album Shiny Beast (Bat Chain Puller), Beefheart and the band undertook a promotional club tour. On Saturday 18 November 1978 they performed at My Father's Place in Roslyn, New York. My Father's Place was located under a motorway bridge, held about 200 people and the patrons sat at long tables and could dine whilst listening if they wished . The show was recorded and mixed directly to two-track tape. Rhino Records made the album available for download, after a limited release on CD.

Track listing
All songs written by Don Van Vliet.

Personnel
 Richard Redus – guitar, slide guitar, accordion
 Jeff Moris Tepper – guitar, slide guitar
 Bruce Fowler – trombone
 Eric Drew Feldman – bass guitar, keyboards, synthesizer
 Robert Williams – drums, percussion
 Don Van Vliet – vocals, tenor saxophone, soprano saxophone, harmonica
 Mary Jane Eisenberg – shake bouquet

References

External links
 http://www.freewebs.com/teejo/live/78fath.html

Captain Beefheart albums
2000 live albums
Rhino Records live albums